Set the Woods on Fire is a studio album by indie rock band Art in Manila. It was released in 2007 via Saddle Creek Records.

Critical reception
AllMusic wrote that "these are thoughtful tracks, carefully developed and arranged by [Orenda] Fink and her collaborators, and while the themes are generally weighty, the singer's voice -- good, but not extraordinary, with clean higher tones that can take on a rougher edge when she moves down the register -- alongside her distinct sense of melody, keep them from sinking into despair or longing or over-dramatics." PopMatters wrote that "the songwriting is rather good, juxtaposing achingly pretty melodies against abrasive, rock-centric beats." Spin praised the album bookends as "pieces of gorgeous sorrow."

Track listing

 "Time Gets Us All"
 "Our Addictions"
 "The Abomination"
 "I Thought I Was Free"
 "Set the Woods on Fire"
 "Golden Dawn"
 "Anything You Love"
 "The Sweat Descends" (Les Savy Fav)
 "Spirit, Run"
 "Precious Pearl"
 "The Game"

Musicians
Orenda Fink
Adrianne Verhoeven
Steve Bartolomei
Dan McCarthy
Ryan Fox
Corey Broman
Joel Peterson – Engineer, Mixing
Andy LeMaster – Mixing
Doug Van Sloun – Mastering

References

External links
Art in Manila on Myspace

2007 albums